Virginia Wesleyan University (VWU) is a private university in Virginia Beach, Virginia. The university is nonsectarian but historically affiliated with The United Methodist Church. It enrolls 1,607 students annually in undergraduate and graduate programs, 355 students at LUJ/VWU Global (Japan), and 1,403 in VWU Online (Continuing Education). Virginia Wesleyan transitioned from a college to a university in 2017. 

The Virginia Wesleyan University campus is also home to the Chesapeake Bay Academy, an educational institution that educates and guides students with learning disabilities, including attention disorders (ADHD), dyslexia, and dysgraphia, and the Tidewater Collegiate Academy, an innovative laboratory for teaching and learning that extends from the primary grades through high school.

Through academic collaboration with local arts and sciences partners, on-site learning experiences are also provided at the Virginia Aquarium & Marine Science Center and Brock Environmental Center in Virginia Beach; The Chrysler Museum of Art in Norfolk; Sentara College of Health Sciences in Chesapeake; and the Norfolk Botanical Garden.

VWU collaborates with Virginia Beach Economic Development for a work development center, The Hive, in Virginia Beach. Approximately 3,000 continuing education learners benefit from joint programs at The Hive.

History
The school was chartered in 1961 as Virginia Wesleyan College under the initiative of Methodist minister Joseph Shackford Johnston, later the college's first president. It became a university in 2017.

Academics

Colleges and schools 
Virginia Wesleyan University consists of four schools devoted to specific areas of study: the Susan S. Goode School of Arts and Humanities, the Joan P. Brock School of Mathematics and Natural Sciences, Birdsong School of Social Science, and the D. Henry Watts School of Professional Studies.

Batten Honors College
The Batten Honors College, named for Virginia Wesleyan Trustee Emerita Jane Batten and her late husband Frank Batten, Sr., was founded in 2017 with a mission to "inspire, engage, and prepare academically talented students to become leaders, environmental stewards, and impactful citizens in the global community."

VWU Global Campus
With the addition of LUJ/VWU Global (Japan), University College at Virginia Wesleyan University was renamed VWU Global Campus. VWU Global Campus operates all for-credit programs outside of the traditional undergraduate program, the campus in Japan, and also supports non-credit, continuing-education offerings. Hampton Roads Workforce Development, Tidewater Community College, and VWU share a workforce development center, The Hive, in Virginia Beach. Approximately 3,000 continuing education learners benefit from joint programs at The Hive.

Westminster/Wesleyan Lifelong Learning Institute
The Westminster/Wesleyan Lifelong Learning Institute is a component of Virginia Wesleyan's University College was launched in 2017. Several courses will be taught during each of two regular semesters, and roughly half will be on faith-related topics. Over 1,100 learners enrolled in WWLLI courses in the 2018–19 academic year.

Diversity and inclusion 
Virginia Wesleyan often states its commitment to inclusivity and one of the institution's core values within its Preeminence '28 strategic plan reads, "Inclusive and Caring Community that empowers members to form meaningful relationships through listening, understanding, and communication."

The university was ranked in 2018 and 2019 by U.S. News & World Report among the top 25 institutions in Campus Ethnic Diversity for National Liberal Arts Colleges. According to the university profile, students represent 34 states and 10 countries, with 43 percent from underrepresented populations.

Virginia Wesleyan's campus is the South Hampton Roads home for the Virginia Center for Inclusive Communities. The 83-year-old organization opened a satellite office at VWU in December 2018. "By opening the VCIC Hampton Roads office at Virginia Wesleyan University, the Virginia Center for Inclusive Communities demonstrates our commitment to stand up to hatred, both by increasing our capacity to respond when ... tragic incidents occur, and by deepening our local work to proactively prevent bias, bullying and discrimination," VCIC Tidewater Chapter Chairman Martin A. Einhorn said at the time.

Business leader and known civil rights advocate Harvey Lindsay made a $250,000 gift to Virginia Wesleyan in 2019 to enable the university to begin expanding the study of African-American history and traditions in Virginia.

Campus

Bray Village (Village I) and Allen Village (Village II) offer combined living-learning environments built on the Jeffersonian model, with multi-purpose buildings. Brock Village (Village III) and Honors Village (Village IV) are solely housing units. Construction began on a fifth village, Oxford Village, in June 2019 with an expected completion in late 2020.

The Robert "Bobby" T. Williams Trail, leading from the Blocker Youth Center to Lake Taylor, was dedicated in October 2019 in memory of the 1975 graduate who was killed in the Virginia Beach Municipal Center shooting in May 2019.

The Greer Environmental Sciences Center, dedicated in 2017, received the Chesapeake Bay Foundation’s National Conservationist of the Year Award in 2018. The facility is a state-of-the-art center for teaching and research. The 18-acre Wilson Arboretum was established in 1995 in memory of William M. Wilson, dean of the university from 1971 to 1994. Since 1997, retiring faculty members have chosen a tree to be planted within the arboretum to honor their service to the institution

The 12-acre Beech Forest, a rare example of an old-growth stand of beech trees, was designated a Natural Heritage Resource by the Commonwealth of Virginia in 1992. The campus features over 13 miles of biking and hiking paths and trails.

Facilities
The following complexes and buildings, with completion dates noted, now house the university's academic, administrative, and residential functions.

Jerry G. Bray, Jr. Village (Village I) (1966)
Residence halls:
Louise W. Eggleston Hall
Abel E. and Clara Eaton Kellam Hall
Margarette Hanes Old Hall
Paul Howard Rose Hall
Academic buildings:
Birdsong Hall
Peter D. Pruden Hall
Aubrey L. Eggleston Commons
Dennie Allen Village (Village II)
Residence halls:
East Hall (1990)
Franklin Little Hall (1990)
Alison J. and Ella W. Parsons Hall (1990)
Walter Clarke Gum Hall (1970)
Joseph S. Johnston Hall (1990)
Landmark Hall
William Travis Smithdeal Hall (1970)
Academic buildings (1990):
Allen Commons
Charles and Bertha Mast Graybeal Hall
Guy C. and Ora Goodwin Roop Hall
Floyd E. Kellam, Jr., Social Sciences Lab (2002, 2014)
Joan and Macon Brock Village (Village III) (1993)
Residence halls:
North Hall
South Hall
Harry I. and Elizabeth W. Teagle Hall
Apartments and townhouses (2005)
Honors Village (Village IV) (2008)
Residence townhouses:
Broyles Hall
DeFord Hall
Hendrix Hall
Mastracco Hall
Watts Hall
Residence Hall 6
 S. Frank and Wilma Williamson Blocker Hall
 Lambuth M. Clarke Hall (1998)
 Susan T. Beverly Hall (2020)/Fine Arts Building (1966)/Edward D. Hofheimer Theatre (1981)
 Greer Environmental Sciences Center (2017)
 Henry Clay Hofheimer II Library (1969, 2008)/Neil Britton Art Gallery
 Greenhouse (2017)
 Susan S. Goode Fine and Performing Arts Center/Joan and Macon Brock Theatre/Eleanor and Henry Watts Grand Lobby and Gallery/Susan Beverly Grand Terrace and Pond (2019)
The following complexes and structures house additional administrative buildings as well as athletic and student activities facilities:

 Jane P. Batten Student Center (2002)/TowneBank Arena (2020)
 Birdsong Field – Paphites Pavilion (2015)
 Frank Blocker, Jr., Youth Center – Tidewater Collegiate Academy/YMCA Camp Red Feather (2017)
 Robert F. and Sara M. Boyd Dining Center (1991)
 Everett Tennis Center (2011)
 Katherine B. and Mills E. Godwin, Jr., Hall (1999)
 Facilities Management (1993)
 The Alpine Tower (2008, 2017)
 Monumental Chapel and Beazley Recital Hall (2020, 1975), The Beacon (2019)
 TowneBank Park—Kenneth R. Perry Field (2017)
 Betty S. Rogers Track and Field Center (2017)
 Trinder Center (1998) with Foster Field (1998)
 TowneBank Park—Tom and Betty Broyles Field (2019)
 Sue Benton Birdsong Entrance Gate (2020)
 DeFord Manor (2021)

Athletics

Virginia Wesleyan University sports teams are known as the Marlins. The university participates in the Old Dominion Athletic Conference (ODAC) and is a member of the National Collegiate Athletic Association (NCAA) Division III.

Men's sports include baseball, basketball, cross country, golf, lacrosse, soccer, swimming, tennis, and indoor/outdoor track and field. Women's sports include basketball, cross country, field hockey, golf, lacrosse, soccer, softball, swimming, tennis, indoor/outdoor track and field, and volleyball.

The university maintains an Athletic Hall of Fame honoring those who have made lasting contributions to Virginia Wesleyan's intercollegiate athletic program through outstanding achievements or service.

In recent years, Virginia Wesleyan University has earned recognition as one of the top NCAA Division III programs in the country. The men's basketball team won the national championship in 2006, and the following year returned to the championship game, which they lost. The women's soccer team made it to the final four in 2006 after winning the ODAC tournament for the first time in program history. In 2016, Evan Cox was the Individual NCAA National Champion for Men's Golf. The Virginia Wesleyan softball team won the 2017 NCAA Division III National Championship with a record 54 wins. Head Coach Brandon Elliott was named ODAC Coach of the Year and State Coach of the Year, while his coaching staff earned Regional and National Coaching Staff of the Year honors. Freshman pitcher Hanna Hull earned 2017 Schutt Sports/NFCA Division III National Freshman of the Year and honors as the first National Player of the Year in program history. In 2018, they repeated as NCAA Division III champions. Hull was again named National Player of the Year, and Elliott's staff again earned National Coaching Staff of the Year honors. Despite a 42–6 overall record, and number one regular season rating in the NFCA Division III poll, the Marlins lost to the University of Lynchburg in the 2019 NCAA Regional Finals. In 2021, the VWU Softball team won its third national title in four (complete) season defeating the Texas Lutheran University in the NCAA Division III Championship best of three series with the Marlins claiming a 9–1 win in five innings in the deciding third game.

Through a private gift, Virginia Wesleyan added an esports arena and competitive esports program in 2019.

Notable alumni

Brandon Adair, National Basketball Association referee
Kelly Convirs-Fowler, representative, U.S. State of Virginia's 21st House of Delegates District
Kevin Nickelberry, assistant basketball coach and recruiting coordinator at Georgetown University
Randy Peele, assistant men's basketball coach at Texas Southern University
Sam Presti, executive vice president and general manager of the Oklahoma City Thunder
Richard H. Stuart, State Senate of Virginia, Representing the 28th District
Bob Valvano, American sportscaster
Keller Williams, American musician

References

External links
 Official website
 Official athletics website

Private universities and colleges in Virginia
Liberal arts colleges in Virginia
Educational institutions established in 1961
Education in Norfolk, Virginia
Education in Virginia Beach, Virginia
Universities and colleges accredited by the Southern Association of Colleges and Schools
1961 establishments in Virginia